The Uglies is an upcoming American science fiction action-fantasy directed by McG, with a script written by Jacob Forman, Vanessa Taylor, and Whit Anderson. The film stars Joey King, who additionally serves as executive producer, in the lead role. Based on the novel Uglies by Scott Westerfeld, the plot centers around a future post-apocalyptic dystopian society.

In development since 2006, before entering a period of development hell, the movie was filmed in 2021. The Uglies is intended to be released via streaming as a Netflix exclusive.

Synopsis
The film follows Tally Youngblood, as she prepares to move into the next chapter of her life. Her best friend Peris has already started that next chapter, having an operation to make him a Pretty in the society they live in. However, there's a snag in her journey to becoming a Pretty. After making friends with Shay, another person with the same birthday as Tally, she is forced to travel outside society and find where Shay has run off to. Shay doesn't want to become Pretty, so she runs away to a place called the Smoke. She leaves Tally instructions on how to get there if she decides to follow her new friend. A government member, Dr. Cable, knows this and sends Tally to the Smoke with an ultimatum: find the Smoke or risk never becoming a Pretty. After a treacherous journey, Tally finds the Smoke and her new friend, but her life will forever change after meeting new people and learning new information that permanently changes how she views the society.

Cast
 Joey King as Tally Youngblood
 Keith Powers
 Brianne Tju
 Chase Stokes
 Laverne Cox

Production

Development
In 2006, a feature film adaptation of Uglies was announced to be in development when 20th Century Fox purchased the film rights to the novel, with John Davis attached to the project. The movie was intended to begin production thereafter, but entered a period of development hell. 

In September 2020, the project re-entered development with Joey King signing on to star in the lead role as Tally Youngblood. King reportedly signed onto the project, after previously being a fan of the Uglies novels. McG signed on to direct, with Krista Vernoff serving as screenwriter. John Davis, Jordan Davis, Robyn Meisinger, Dan Spilo, McG, and Mary Viola will produce the movie. The project will be a joint-venture production between Davis Entertainment Company, Anonymous Content, Industry Entertainment, Wonderland Sound and Vision, and Netflix Original Films. The film is intended to release through streaming exclusively on Netflix. Later that year, Keith Powers, Brianne Tju, Chase Stokes, and Laverne Cox joined the supporting cast.

Filming
In February 2022, King revealed that production had already finished, and had taken place in Atlanta, Georgia in December of 2021.

Release
The Uglies is intended to be released exclusively on Netflix at an as-of-yet unspecified date.

References

External links
 

Upcoming films
American dystopian films
American fantasy action films
American science fiction action films
Anonymous Content films
Davis Entertainment films
Films based on American novels
Films based on young adult literature
Films directed by McG
Films produced by John Davis
Films produced by McG
Films shot in Atlanta
Upcoming English-language films
Upcoming Netflix original films
Wonderland Sound and Vision films